Moody is an English surname. It ranks in the top 200 most common surnames in English speaking nations.  The earliest known example dates from the 12th century in a Devonshire early English charter where the name Alwine 'Modig' is mentioned. Recent census research suggests that the surname has been most consistently populous in Somerset, Wiltshire and Hampshire and also in areas of northeast England. There is also a high incidence of the similar-sounding surname  'Moodie' in Scotland, in particular Orkney, although this variant, ending "ie", has possible Norse/Celtic origins. The surname Moody was also carried to areas of Ireland settled by the early English. Although the most intensive areas of occurrence match areas of dense Anglo-Saxon habitation after 1066, it is difficult to determine if the name is Anglo-Saxon or Nordic/Viking in origin, since all Germanic countries used the word 'Modig' or 'Mutig' to indicate someone who was bold, impetuous or brave.  Surnames were increasingly given through the early Middle Ages to assist taxation and an increasing incidence of the name can be followed in such documents as the Hundred Rolls, early English charters and general medieval assizes associated with such actions as baronial struggles, Crusades or Angevin campaigns in France.
In the Netherlands, there is a family name 'Mudde' derived from a Scottish immigrant Robert Moodie.

There was a significant incidence of the name among early American immigrants from England in the 17th century.

Some notable bearers of the Moody surname include:

Politics and government
Arthur Moody (1891–1976), British politician
Blair Moody (1902–1954), American politician
Blair Moody, Jr. (1928–1982), American judge, Served on Michigan's Supreme as a Justice.
Charles Moody (1792–1867), British politician
Dan Moody (1893–1966), American politician
David Moody (politician), South Australian politician
Gideon C. Moody (1832–1904), American politician
Bill Moody (judge), American judge
James M. Moody (1858–1901), American politician
James Maxwell Moody (born 1940), American judge
James Moody (loyalist) ( – 1809), Canadian politician
James S. Moody, Jr. (born 1947), American judge
James Tyne Moody (born 1938), American judge
Jim Moody (born 1935), American politician
John M. Moody (died 1884), American politician
Malcolm A. Moody (1854–1925), American politician
Richard Moody (1813–1887), first Lieutenant-Governor of the Colony of British Columbia
Thomas Moody (British Army officer) (1779–1849), British expert aide-de-camp to the British Colonial Office, geopolitical theorist
Tom Moody (politician) (1930–2008), American politician
William Henry Moody (1853–1917), American politician and jurist
Zenas Ferry Moody (1832–1917), American politician

Arts
Ben Moody (born 1981), American musician and songwriter
Charles E. Moody (1891–1977), American gospel songwriter and performer
Clyde Moody (1915–1989), American musician
Dave Moody (musician) (born 1962), American musician
David Moody (writer) (born 1970), English writer
Elizabeth Moody (actor) (1939–2010), New Zealand actress and director
Elizabeth Moody (1737–1814), British poet and literary critic
Ivan Moody (born 1980), American singer
Ivan Moody (born 1964), British composer
James Moody (composer) (1907–1995), Irish musician
James Moody (saxophonist) (1925–2010), American jazz musician
Jim Moody (actor) (born 1949), American actor
King Moody (1929–2001), American actor
Laurence Moody (born c1954), English television director
Lynne Moody (born 1950), American actress
Micky Moody (born 1950), English guitarist
Ralph Moody (author) (1898–1982), American author
Rick Moody (born 1961), American author
Ron Moody (1924–2015), English actor
Ronald Moody (1900–1984), British sculptor
Ruth Moody, Canadian musician
Spencer Moody, American singer
Susan Moody (born 1940), English novelist
Tom Moody (artist), American visual artist
William Vaughn Moody (1869–1910), American dramatist and poet

Sports
Andrea Moody (born 1978), Canadian swimmer
Bailey Moody (born 2001), American wheelchair basketball player
Chris Moody (born 1953), English golfer
Christian Moody (born 1983), American basketball player
Emmanuel Moody (born 1987), American football running back
Eric Moody (baseball) (born 1971), American baseball pitcher
Frank Moody (1900–1963), Welsh boxer
Glenn Moody (born 1964), English darts player
Harold Moody (athlete) (1915-1986), British shot putter
Heather Moody (born 1973), American water polo player
Helen Wills Moody (1905–1998), American tennis player
Jake Moody, American football player
Joe Moody (rugby union) All Black Rugby player
John Moody (badminton), New Zealand badminton player
John Moody (footballer) (1904–1963), English footballer
Keith Moody (born 1953), American football defensive back
Kurtis Moody (born 1993), American basketball player
Lewis Moody (born 1978), English rugby player
Matthew Moody (born 1985), Australian rules footballer
Mick Moody (born 1960), Irish footballer
Orville Moody (1933–2008), American golfer
Patricia Moody (born 1934), British canoeist
Paul Moody (footballer) (born 1967), English footballer
Ralph Moody (1917–2004), American racecar driver and owner
Rick Moody (coach), American basketball coach
Tera Moody (born 1980), American runner
Toby Moody, British motorsport announcer
Tom Moody (born 1965), Australian cricketer and coach
William Moody (Paul Bearer) (1954–2013), American professional wrestler and wrestling manager

Academics
Ernest Addison Moody (1903–1975), American philosopher
Lewis Ferry Moody (1880–1953), American engineer and professor
Nancy B. Moody, American college president
Paul Dwight Moody (1879–1947), American college president
Robert Moody (born 1941), Canadian mathematician
Theodore William Moody (1907–1984), Irish historian

Business
John Moody (financial analyst) (1868–1958), American financial analyst
Maxey Dell Moody (1883–1949), American businessman
Maxey Dell Moody Jr. (1913–1987), American businessman
Maxey Dell Moody III (1944 - ), American businessman
Sewell Moody (1834–1875), Canadian businessman
Shearn Moody, Jr. (1933–1996), American financier
William Lewis Moody, Jr. (1865–1954), American financier

Other
Alexander Moody Stuart (1809–1898), Scottish minister
Anne Moody (1940–2015), American author and civil rights activist
Charles Amadon Moody (?-1910), American author and book reviewer
Dwight L. Moody (1837–1899), American evangelist and publisher
Glyn Moody, technology writer
Harold Moody (physician) (1882–1947), British doctor
James Bradfield Moody (born 1976), Australian engineer
James Paul Moody (1887–1912), British sailor and only junior officer to die in the Titanic disaster
Jimmy Moody (died 1993), English mobster
John Moody (journalist), American journalist
Juanita Moody (born 1924), American cryptographer 
Ludlow Moody (1892–1981), Jamaican doctor
Mary Blair Moody (1837–1919), American physician
Maryon Pearson née Moody (1902–1991), wife of Canadian Prime Minister Lester B. Pearson
Paul Moody (inventor) (1779–1831), American inventor
Raymond Moody (born 1944), American parapsychologist
Slomon Moody (1834-1898), American physician

Fictional
Mad-Eye Moody, a character in the Harry Potter books
Hank Moody, a character from the television series Californication

Joss Moody, the main character in Trumpet by Jackie Kay 
Judy Moody, the main character of a book series by Megan McDonald

References

English-language surnames